Fraser Murphy (born 2 January 1963) is a former Australian rules footballer who played for Carlton in the VFL.

Murphy was a rover who played 107 games for Carlton. He was recruited in 1984, after finishing as runner-up for the J. J. Liston Trophy while playing for Geelong West in the VFA in 1983. He kicked 39 goals for Carlton in 1985, and played in Carlton's 1987 premiership team. After leaving the club in 1991 he moved to Collingwood, but did not end up playing a game for them, and then returned to the VFA with Werribee in 1992.

References

External links

1963 births
Living people
Australian rules footballers from Victoria (Australia)
Carlton Football Club players
Carlton Football Club Premiership players
Geelong West Football Club players
Werribee Football Club players
One-time VFL/AFL Premiership players